Pocomoto is the central character in a series of some 23 books written by the author Rex Dixon (a pseudonym for the author Reginald Alec Martin). The books are a children's western series focusing on Pocomoto's adventures.

Books
 Pocomoto-Pony Express Rider ... Illustrated by Jack Harman, Nelson 1953
 Pocomoto-Tenderfoot ... Illustrated by Jack Harman.. Nelson 1953
 Pocomoto-Bronco Buster ... Illustrated by Jack Harman, Nelson 1953
 Pocomoto and the Night Riders ... Illustrated by Jack Harman, Nelson 1953
 Pocomoto and the Canyon Treasure, Nelson 1954
 Pocomoto-Brush Popper ... Illustrated by Jack Harman, Nelson 1954
 Pocomoto and the Li'l Fella ... Illustrated by Jack Harman Nelson 1954
 Pocomoto-Buffalo Hunter ... Illustrated by Jack Harman, Nelson 1954
 Pocomoto-Cowboy Cavalier, Nelson 1955
 Pocomoto and the Lazy River ... Illustrated by Jack Harman, Nelson 1955
 Pocomoto and the Snow Wolf ... Illustrated by Jack Harman, Nelson, 1955
 Pocomoto and the Indian Trails ... Illustrated by Jack Harman, Nelson, 1956
 Pocomoto and the Robbers' Trail ... Illustrated by Jack Harman, Nelson 1956
 Pocomoto and the Spanish Steed ... Illustrated by Eric Tansley. .Nelson 1957
 Pocomoto and the Desert Gold ... Illustrated by Robert Hodgson. Nelson 1957
 Pocomoto and the Circus Folk ... Illustrated by Robert Hodgson, Nelson 1957
 Pocomoto and the Texas Pioneers ... Illustrated by Robert Hodgson, Nelson 1958
 Pocomoto and the Lazy Sheriff ... Illustrated by Robert Hodgson, Nelson 1958
 Pocomoto and the Lost Hunters ... Illustrated by Robert Hodgson, Nelson 1959
 Pocomoto and the Texas Ranger ... Illustrated by Robert Hodgson, Nelson 1960.
 Pocomoto and the Golden Herd ... Illustrated by Robert Hodgson, Nelson 1960.
 Pocomoto and the Warrior Braves ... Illustrated by Robert Hodgson, Nelson 1961.
 Pocomoto and the Mexican Bandits, Nelson 1963.

Characters in children's literature
Series of children's books